Below is a list of mayors of Washington, D.C. and associated political entities.

History of offices 

The federal district of the United States was first designated by the amended Residence Act of 1790.  That Act designated that the President could appoint three commissioners to locate, define and survey an area not exceeding ten miles square as the capital district, following the Constitutional mandate to do so.  From 1791 to 1802 the District was managed by that three-member Board of Commissioners of the Federal City as listed below.

With the passage of the District of Columbia Organic Act of 1801, the District was brought under the direct political control of Congress.  The Board of Commissioners was dissolved.  That Act made no provision for an executive for the District as a whole.  The District consisted of five political subdivisions:  three cities with their own municipal governments, and two rural counties.  The pre-existing city of Georgetown and its mayors are listed below.  The pre-existing city of Alexandria,  Virginia, had its own list of mayors before, during and after its inclusion in the District.  And the new City of Washington was chartered shortly after the District, in 1802.  Its mayors also appear below.  The rural county west of the Potomac, formerly Virginia, was Alexandria County.  Finally to the east and outside the cities, formerly Maryland, lay Washington County, D.C.  (Both counties were governed by levy courts made of providentially appointed Justices of the Peace, whose members do not appear below. Prior to 1802, those Justices of the Peace were appointed by the governors of Maryland and Virginia, after which they were appointed by the President until they were abolished in 1871).

In 1846, Alexandria County and the City of Alexandria returned to Virginia, leaving the District with two independent cities and one county.

In 1871, with the District of Columbia Organic Act, those three subdivisions within the District were unified into a single government, whose chief executive was a territorial Governor.  As listed below, only two served before this office was abolished in 1874, and replaced with a temporary three-member Board of Commissioners appointed by the President. The board was made permanent in 1878 and this system continued until 1967, when it was replaced by a single mayor-commissioner and city council appointed by the President.  Finally, in 1974, the District of Columbia Home Rule Act allowed for District residents to elect their own mayor.

Currently, the Mayor of the District of Columbia is popularly elected to a four-year term with no term limits. Even though District of Columbia is not a state, the district government also has certain state-level responsibilities, making some of the mayor's duties analogous to those of United States governors. The current mayor of the District of Columbia is Muriel Bowser, a Democrat, who has served in the role since January 2, 2015.

The lists on this page include all of the chief executives of the District of Columbia in their various forms.

1791–1802: Board of Commissioners of the Federal City
The 1790 Act for establishing the temporary and permanent seat of the Government of the United States, Act of March 3, 1791, 1 Stat. 214, set up a board of three commissioners to survey and define the territory of the Federal City, and to purchase land for development and oversee the construction of all federal buildings. Some reports name Thomas Johnson as the chairman of the Board of Commissioners, but it appears there was no chair, even if Johnson acted in the manner of a chair. The commission had very little to do with the municipal regulation of the District and when their board was dissolved their powers were transferred to the "Superintendent", "Commissioner to Superintend Public Buildings" and the "Chief Engineer of the United States Army." The local public affairs were instead governed by a Levy Court made up of Justices of the Peace who, until passage of the Organic Act of 1801 were commissioned by the governors of Virginia (for Arlington County) and Maryland (for Prince George's and Montgomery County – the north part of the District remained part of these counties until 1801), and in the Federal city their powers were transferred to the Mayor and local government. During this time William Thornton, Robert Bowie, Daniel Carroll, and Robert Brent were some of the men who served on the Levy Court of Prince George's County.

1802–1871: Mayors of the City of Washington
The persons listed below are the mayors of the now-defunct City of Washington, which was officially granted a formal government in 1802. The Mayor of Washington had authority over city services, appointments, and local tax assessments; however, the duties of the mayor mostly consisted of requesting appropriations from Congress to finance the city. From 1802 to 1812, the mayor was appointed by the President of the United States. Between 1812 and 1820, the city's mayors were then selected by a city council. From 1820 to 1871 the mayor was popularly elected. The present-day boundaries of the "Old City" were Rock Creek to the west, Florida Avenue to the north, and the Anacostia River to the east and south.

Starting in March 1801 the County of Washington, which included the city (or corporation) of Washington and the city of Georgetown, was governed by a Levy Court, of unfixed number, made up of Justices of the Peace chosen by the President. It was one of these Justice of the Peace appointments, made in the 24 hours between the passage of the Organic Act of 1801 and the end of John Adams' term that became the subject of Marbury v. Madison. In 1804, the Levy Court lost the power to tax the residents of Washington City, but in 1808 the city was required to contribute to the revenue of the county and in 1826 the Levy Court lost the power to tax those in Georgetown. An 1812 law fixed the number of judges to seven, two from east of Rock Creek but outside of Washington City, two from west of Rock Creek but outside of Georgetown and three from Georgetown, with none from Washington City until an 1848 law added four members from the city. Even when the City of Washington was not represented on the Levy Court, they were still required to contribute to the costs of the county, except for bridges and roads outside its boundaries. The court was again changed in 1863 when it was reduced to nine members, three from the city of Washington, one from Georgetown, and five from county lands outside the city. The Levy Court was disbanded in 1871 with the Mayor when congress consolidated all the remaining governments in DC. Some of the more prominent members of the Levy Court include Thomas Corcoran, John Cox, George W. Riggs, and Sayles J. Bown

1790–1871: Mayors of Georgetown
From 1751 to 1789, Georgetown was governed by Commissioners who were either appointed by an act of Maryland or were elected by the other commissioners to fill vacancies. in 1790 the government was changed to include a Mayor, a Recorder, Aldermen and a Common Council.  During this time it was governed by nineteen different commissioners.

Georgetown was a town in Maryland until 1801, when it became a municipality within the District of Columbia. From 1802 until 1871, mayors of Georgetown were elected to one-year terms, with no term limits. Like the City of Washington and Washington County, Georgetown's local government ceased to exist in 1871, when Congress merged the three entities into the single District government.

1871–1874: Governors of the District of Columbia
In 1871, Congress created a territorial government for the entire District of Columbia, which was headed by a governor appointed by the President of the United States to a four-year term. Due to alleged mismanagement and corruption, including allegations of contractors bribing members of the District legislature to receive contracts, the territorial government was discontinued in 1874.

1874–1878: Commissioners of the District of Columbia
From 1874 to 1878 the District was administered by a three-member, temporary Board of Commissioners with both legislative and executive authority, all appointed by the President. They were assisted by an engineer (Captain Richard L. Hoxie). The law made no provision for a President to this board of temporary Commissioners, and none was ever elected, but Commissioner Dennison acted in that capacity at all board meetings he attended.

1878–1967: Presidents of the Board of Commissioners
In 1878, the Board of Commissioners was made permanent and re-organized. From 1878 to 1967, the District was administered by this new three-member Board of Commissioners with both legislative and executive authority, all appointed by the President. The board comprised one Democrat, one Republican, and one civil engineer with no specified party. The three Commissioners would then elect one of their number to serve as president of the board. While not quite analogous to the role of a mayor, the president of the board was the district's Chief Executive.

1967–1975: Mayor-Commissioner
In 1967, President Lyndon Johnson presented to Congress a plan to reorganize the District's government. The three-commissioner system was replaced by a government headed by a single mayor-commissioner, an assistant mayor-commissioner, and a nine-member district council, all appointed by the president. The mayor-commissioner and his assistant served four-year terms, while the councilmembers served three-year terms. While the council was officially nonpartisan, no more than six of Councilmembers could be of the same political party. Councilmembers were expected to work part-time. All councilmembers and either the mayor-commissioner or his assistant was required to have been a resident of the District of Columbia for the three years preceding appointment. All must be District residents while serving their terms in office.

Council members had the quasi-legislative powers of the former Board of Commissioners, approving the budget and setting real estate tax rates. The mayor-commissioner could, without any Congressional approval, consolidate District agencies and transfer money between agencies, powers that the preceding Board of Commissioners had not possessed since 1952. The mayor-commissioner could veto the actions of the council, but the council could override the veto with a three-fourths vote.

Despite a push by many Republicans and conservative Democrats in the House of Representatives to reject Johnson's plan, the House of Representatives accepted the new form of government for the District by a vote of 244 to 160. Johnson said that the new District government would be more effective and efficient.

Walter E. Washington was appointed the first mayor-commissioner, and Thomas W. Fletcher was appointed the first assistant mayor-commissioner. The first Council appointments were Chairman John W. Hechinger, Vice Chairman Walter E. Fauntroy, Stanley J. Anderson, Margaret A. Haywood, John A. Nevius, William S. Thompson, J.C. Turner, Polly Shackleton, and Joseph P. Yeldell.

1975–present: Mayors of the District of Columbia

Since 1975, the District has been administered by a popularly elected mayor and district council.

 Parties

Succession

See also

 Timeline of Washington, D.C.

References

External links

 01
 01
Washington, DC
Mayors
Mayors, List
Mayors, List
District of Columbia